Andrei Andonie Burcă (born 15 April 1993) is a Romanian professional footballer who plays for Liga I club CFR Cluj and the Romania national team. Mainly a centre-back, he can also be deployed as a right-back.

Burcă began his career in the lower divisions with hometown clubs Aerostar Bacău and SC Bacău, before signing for top flight team Botoșani in 2016. Three years later, his good display earned him a transfer to defending champions CFR Cluj.

Burcă made his full international debut for Romania in September 2019, starting in a 3–2 UEFA Nations League victory over Austria.

Club career

Early career / Botoșani
Burcă started his senior career with hometown club Aerostar Bacău, and then moved to neighbouring SC Bacău in 2013. He made his debut in the second tier of the Romanian league system on 14 September that year, in a 0–2 loss to CSM Studențesc Iași. 

Following the conclusion of the 2015–16 season, his team withdrew from the championship because of financial issues; Burcă hence contemplated about retiring from football and starting college. He however received contract proposals from Foresta Suceava and Botoșani, and after signing with the latter he went on to amass over one hundred matches in the Liga I between 2016 and 2019.

CFR Cluj
On 10 June 2019, Burcă joined reigning champions CFR Cluj for an undisclosed transfer fee. With "the Railwaymen", he was a starter in all eight matches in the 2019–20 edition of the UEFA Champions League qualifiers, as his team was eliminated in the play-off round by Slavia Prague. He also played in all eight Europa League games, scoring once in a 2–0 home victory over Scottish club Celtic on 12 December. 

On 3 August 2020, Burcă won his first career trophy after a 3–1 success against Universitatea Craiova in the final Liga I fixture. On 15 April 2021, he started in the 4–1 penalty shoot-out defeat of FCSB in the Supercupa României.

International career
On 7 September 2020, Burcă recorded his debut for the Romania national team by playing the full 90 minutes as a right-back in a 3–2 UEFA Nations League away win over Austria.

Career statistics

Club

International

Honours
CFR Cluj
Liga I: 2019–20, 2020–21, 2021–22
Supercupa României: 2020; runner-up: 2019, 2021, 2022

Individual
Liga I Team of the Season:  2019–20, 2020–21,  2021–22

References

External links

1993 births
Living people
Sportspeople from Bacău
Romanian footballers
Association football defenders
Association football fullbacks
Liga I players
Liga II players
CS Aerostar Bacău players
FC Botoșani players
CFR Cluj players
Romania international footballers